Eupithecia impurata is a moth of the family Geometridae. It is found from the mountainous areas of western, eastern and southern Europe up to Western Asia.

The wingspan is 19–24 mm. Adults are on wing from May to August and again from September to October in two generations per year.

The larvae feed on the flowers and fruit of Campanula cespitosa, Campanula cochleariifolia and Campanula rotundifolia.

Subspecies
Eupithecia impurata impurata
Eupithecia impurata badeniata Schutze, 1952
Eupithecia impurata franconiata Schutze, 1956
Eupithecia impurata germanicata Schutze, 1952
Eupithecia impurata gremmingerata Schutze, 1952
Eupithecia impurata langeata Schutze, 1952
Eupithecia impurata thuringiata Schutze, 1956
Eupithecia impurata westfalicata Weigt, 1982

References

External links
Lepiforum.de
schmetterlinge-deutschlands.de

Moths described in 1813
impurata
Moths of Europe
Moths of Asia
Taxa named by Jacob Hübner